I Feel Good most commonly refers to the song "I Got You (I Feel Good)" by James Brown.

It may also refer to:
I Feel Good!, a 1970 album by John Lee Hooker 
 I Feel Good (album), 2015 album by Daniel Padilla
 I Feel Good (film), 2018 film
 "I Feel Good", 2021 song by Pitbull
 "I Feel Good", 2012 song by EXID, from Hippity Hop
 "I Feel Good", 2015 song by Lil Wayne, from Free Weezy Album
 "I Feel Good", a 2009 television episode from ER (season 15)

See also
 Feel Good (disambiguation)
 Feeling Good (disambiguation)